Ortonovo is a frazione (borough) in the comune of Luni in the Province of La Spezia, Liguria, north-western Italy.

Until April 2017 it was the name of the commune including both Ortonovo and Luni.

Main sights
The ancient town is surrounded by a line of walls with two entrances. In the central square is the Guinigi Tower, today the campanile of the church of St. Lawrence (17th century) but once connected to a now disappeared castle. Other sights include:

 Church of Sts. James and Philip (15th century)
 Sanctuary of Mirteto (16th century)
 Castle of Volpiglione

Frazioni of the Province of La Spezia
Former municipalities of Liguria